Hüseyin Tahirzade Behzat (1889–1962), or Hossein Taherzadeh Behzad Tabrizi, was an Iranian miniaturist painter, calligrapher, educator, and carpet designer. He is considered one of the most important miniature artists of Iran, and has produced approximately 400 articles and artworks. In the present day his miniatures and carpet designs receive a great amount of attention.

Biography 
Tahirzade Behzat was born in 1889 in Tabriz, Persia. He received his training in painting at academies in Istanbul (now Mimar Sinan Fine Arts University) and Tbilisi (now Tbilisi State Academy of Arts), after which he returned to Iran.

He is credited with the development of an Iranian heroic national style to decorate the palaces of Reza Shah in collaboration with a team that consisted of craftsmen and architects. He created and/or directed the creation of these large scale wall murals which also lends credit to him as developing Pahlavi modernity. A section of the Negarestan Garden Palace was turned into a museum under the supervision of Behzat in 1930.

Behzat taught miniature painting and calligraphy at the State Academy of Fine Arts, Istanbul from 1947. Among his students at the academy were Neşe Aybey and others. He was honored with the nickname Müzeyyenü'l Sultan. In 2015 an exhibition in Tehran displayed the works of Behzat and the tools that he used in his work.

References

Sources 
 
 

1962 deaths
1889 births
Iranian academics
Miniature painting

Tbilisi State Academy of Arts alumni
Mimar Sinan Fine Arts University alumni